The 2003 Country Music Association Awards, 37th Ceremony, was held on November 5, 2003 at the Grand Ole Opry House, Nashville, Tennessee, and hosted by CMA Award Winner, Vince Gill. Toby Keith lead the evening with 7 nominations, including Album of the Year, and Entertainer of the Year. Alan Jackson and Johnny Cash (posthumously) took home the most awards with 3 each.

Winners and Nominees

References 

Country Music Association
CMA
Country Music Association Awards
Country Music Association Awards
November 2003 events in the United States
2003 awards in the United States
21st century in Nashville, Tennessee
Events in Nashville, Tennessee